Expedition 22 was the 22nd long duration crew flight to the International Space Station (ISS). This expedition began on December 1, 2009 when the Expedition 21 crew departed. For a period of 3 weeks, there were only 2 crew members; it was the first time that had happened since STS-114. Commander Jeff Williams and flight engineer Maksim Surayev were joined by the rest of their crew on 22 December 2009, making the Expedition 22 a crew of five.

The expedition ended when Soyuz TMA-16 undocked on 18 March 2010, and was immediately followed by the start of Expedition 23.

Crew

Backup crew
Shannon Walker – Commander
Aleksandr Skvortsov
Douglas H. Wheelock
Anton Shkaplerov
Satoshi Furukawa

Spacewalks

Gallery

See also
 2010 in spaceflight
 List of human spaceflights
 List of International Space Station spacewalks
 List of spacewalks 2000–2014

References

External links

NASA's Space Station Expeditions page
Expedition 22 Photography

Expeditions to the International Space Station
2009 in spaceflight
2010 in spaceflight